The Pew Center for Arts & Heritage is a nonprofit grantmaking organization and knowledge-sharing hub for arts and culture in Philadelphia, Pennsylvania, US established in 2005. In 2008, Paula Marincola was named the first executive director. The Center receives funding from The Pew Charitable Trusts and makes project grants in two areas, Performance and Exhibitions & Public Interpretation, as well as awarding grants to individual artists through Pew Fellowships. In 2021, the Center announced the introduction of Re:imagining Recovery grants to assist in COVID-19 recovery.

History and timeline 

In 2005, The Pew Charitable Trusts brought seven programs—in dance, visual arts and exhibitions, heritage, cultural management, music, theater, and individual artist fellowships—together under one roof, as The Philadelphia Center for Arts & Heritage. The Center received its current name in 2008. These programs have since merged to form a single entity that awards grants throughout Greater Philadelphia. In 2013 the Center merged its Project Grant programs to create two new funding categories: Performance and Exhibitions & Public Interpretation. Since 1989, the Center has awarded over $153 million to artists and arts organizations in the Southeastern Pennsylvania region, which includes Bucks, Chester, Delaware, Montgomery, and Philadelphia counties.

The historical timeline for The Pew Center for Arts & Heritage is as follows:

 1989: Philadelphia Music Project
 1991: Pew Fellowships in the Arts
 1993: Dance Advance
 1995: Philadelphia Theatre Initiative
 1997: Philadelphia Exhibitions Initiative
 1998: Heritage Philadelphia Program
 2001: Philadelphia Cultural Management Initiative
 2005: Programs brought together as The Philadelphia Center for Arts & Heritage
 2008: Center renamed The Pew Center for Arts & Heritage
 2013: Center moves from seven to three funding areas: Performance, Exhibitions & Public Interpretation, and Pew Fellowships
 2021: Center introduces Re:imagining Recovery grants to assist in COVID-19 recovery.

Pew Fellowships 

Pew Fellowships is a funding program of The Pew Center for Arts & Heritage,  established by the Pew Charitable Trusts in 1991, which offers direct support to individual Philadelphia-area artists across disciplines, annually awarding up to 12 unrestricted grants of $75,000. Beginning in 2019, the Pew Fellows-in-Residence program awards fellowships to two artists. The Pew Fellowships provide artists with an economic freedom that presents the opportunity to focus on their individual practices over a considerable period of time—to explore, to experiment, and to develop their work. The program aims to elevate the quality and raise the profile of individual artistic work in Philadelphia's five-county region, to create a strong community of Pew Fellows, and to help them achieve their artistic and career goals by connecting them to additional resources in the field.

Pew Fellowships are by nomination only, and selections are made through a two-tier peer review process. Applications are first reviewed by discipline-specific panels, which select finalists to be reviewed by a final interdisciplinary panel. Panelists are artists and arts and culture professionals from outside of the Philadelphia area; chosen for their expertise, they serve for one year. See a full history of Pew Fellowships recipients.

Advancement grants 
Advancement grants were awarded to high-performing cultural organizations in the five-county Philadelphia region, and are intended to support organizations seeking to make lasting improvements to their programming, audience engagement, and financial health. Advancement grants were awarded from 2014 to 2017.

As hub for knowledge-sharing 

Beyond its work as a cultural grantmaker in Philadelphia, the Center has established itself as a hub for knowledge-sharing beyond the region, working in the areas of artistic expression and cultural interpretation. To engage in an international arts dialogue, the Center develops and hosts a range of activities, which concern artistic production, interpretation, and presentation. Activities include lectures, symposia, and workshops, and commissioned scholarship to explore critical issues in the fields served by the Center. The Center's website houses a series of online essays and interviews, along with information about Center-funded events and grantees.

A multidisciplinary group of cultural practitioners, scholars, and consultants from around the world have contributed to the Center's ongoing knowledge-sharing activities, including Jérôme Bel,  Romeo Castellucci, Tacita Dean, Anna Deavere Smith, Thelma Golden, Anna Halprin, Barkley L. Hendricks, Bill T. Jones, Miranda July, Tony Kushner, Claudia La Rocco, Ralph Lemon, Paul Schimmel, David Lang (composer), Boris Charmatz, Ann Hamilton (artist), and many more.

Director, playwright, and actor Ain Gordon served as the Center's inaugural Visiting Artist from 2011–13, returning for an additional term in 2018–2019.

Kristy Edmunds, Executive and Artistic Director, Center for the Art of Performance at the University of California, Los Angeles, served as the Center's first Visiting Scholar. Dr. Suse Anderson, Museum Studies professor at George Washington University, current president at Museum Computer Network, and host of the Best of the Web Awards-winning podcast Museopunks, served as the Center's first Visiting Technologist in 2018-19.

Publications and research 

Center publications include Pigeons on the Grass Alas: Contemporary Curators Talk About the Field, The Sentient Archive: Bodies, Performance, and Memory, and What Makes a Great Exhibition?, an essay anthology that examines various components of exhibition-making, edited by Paula Marincola.

In 2011, the Center published Letting Go? Sharing Historical Authority in a User-Generated World, an anthology of thought pieces and case studies related to shared historical authority in museums and public humanities projects. The anthology explores subfields such as oral history and digital humanities to interrogate the changing nature of expertise in the museum field, and considers co-curation as a method for encouraging public engagement.

The Center's danceworkbook series offers web-based publications that explore the choreographic process. In February 2015, the Center launched the fourth iteration of the series, A Steady Pulse: Restaging Lucinda Childs, 1963–78.

In January 2017, the Center produced In Terms of Performance  in collaboration with the Arts Research Center at the University of California, Berkeley. The online keywords anthology features essays and interviews from more than 50 prominent artists, curators, presenters, and scholars who reflect on common yet contested terms in interdisciplinary cultural practice.

In 2019, the Center published Site Read, an anthology in which "seven exhibition makers lay out the motivations, conditions, logistics, and consequences of shows they organized that now stand as icons of structural innovation in terms of site," published by Mousse Publishing.

List of Pew Fellows (1992-2020)

See also 
 Pew Fellowships in the Arts
 The Pew Charitable Trusts
 Paula Marincola

References

External links 
 The Pew Center for Arts & Heritage
 Full List of Pew Fellows, PCAH Website
 "Cash is king. But it's not everything!" Grantmakers in the Arts website

Organizations based in Philadelphia
Awards established in 1991
Fellowships
Culture of Philadelphia
Art in Pennsylvania
The Pew Charitable Trusts

1991 establishments in Pennsylvania
Organizations established in 2005
2005 establishments in Pennsylvania